David Beriáin Amatriáin (1977 – 26 April 2021) was a Spanish journalist, producer, and documentary anchor, who specialized in armed conflicts, violence, and immersion journalism.

Biography 
Beriáin graduated from the University of Navarra with a degree in information sciences. During his professional career, he interviewed members of the Taliban, FARC guerrillas, members of drug cartels, and hitmen. He became known for presenting and directing the television show 'Clandestino', which aired on Discovery Max.
Beriáin worked for La Voz de Galicia in the international section from March 2001 to July 2007. He was a special envoy for this newspaper in the second war in Iraq and the war in Afghanistan, where he covered the Spanish contingent in the city of Herat and the town of Qala e Naw. As a war correspondent for La Voz de Galicia, he covered conflicts in Iraq, Afghanistan, Sudan, Congo, and Libya. He directed reports about each country, and was one of the few reporters in the world who was able to enter the FARC camps. He also worked in other media, such as the Argentine newspaper El Liberal. On television, he was part of the team of reporters for the REC program broadcast by Cuatro. On Antena 3, he carried out a report on the Fukushima Daiichi nuclear disaster.

In 2012, he founded the audiovisual production company 93 Metros, which specializes in large audiovisual formats, data journalism, and design of advertising content and other innovative technologies.

Awards 
 José Manuel Porquet Digital Journalism Award for "Diez días con las FARC"
 Nominated in Normandy's Bayeux
 RealScreen Awards, topicality documentaries award for 'El negocio del secuestro en Venezuela' in 2019
 RealScreen Awards for 'La Colombia de las FARC' in 2016

Death 
On 26 April 2021, Beriáin was killed at the age of 44, alongside fellow Spanish journalist Roberto Fraile and Irish conservationist Rory Young, while they were filming a documentary about poaching in Pama, Burkina Faso. Their convoy was ambushed by Nusrat al-Islam, which then opened fire against them.

References 

1977 births
2021 deaths
21st-century Spanish journalists
21st-century Spanish writers
Assassinated Spanish journalists
Deaths by firearm in Burkina Faso
Male murder victims
People from Tafalla (comarca)
People murdered in Burkina Faso
Spanish journalists
Spanish male journalists
Spanish people murdered abroad
Spanish war correspondents
University of Navarra alumni